The Old Rectory is a grade II* listed townhouse in Plympton, Devon, England. It was listed on 23 April, 1952.

The building was formerly the rectory for the Church of St Maurice across the former marketplace immediately to the north.

Exterior

As revealed when the British archaeology television programme Time Team visited Plympton in 1998, today's building was installed around the earlier shell, leaving a one-foot gap between the two frontages. When the rebuild happened, around the turn of the 17th century, the road was raised to provide a grand entrance to the new front door and, in so doing, created a basement from the formerly ground-level main floor of the medieval house.

The main façade has seven sash windows on the first floor and six on the ground floor, with the door in the middle. All of the windows are original to the reconstructed house. Below each first-floor window are friezes.

The door is set back about two feet into the façade, atop three stone steps.

As of 2017, the building is painted salmon pink, with its trim painted white. It was previously painted cream, with white trim.

References

Georgian architecture in England
Clergy houses in England
Grade II* listed buildings in Devon
Buildings and structures in Plympton, Devon